Alexei Alexeievich Karabanov is a Russian military musician and director in the Russian Navy. He currently serves as the director of the Central Navy Band of Russia and was the long time director of the Admiralty Navy Band of Russia.

Biography 
He was born in May 1961 in the northwestern city of Leningrad (now Saint-Petersburg). In 1991, Alexei Karabanov received his first invitation to perform at international concerts with the band, with his first tour outside of Russia taking place in Northern France at the Fifth International Festival of Military Music in Lille. Since that time, the band, under Karabanov's leadership, has regularly appeared in festivals and concerts and musical classes in the West, such as his October 1993 visit to Brigham Young University in Utah, where he gave classroom lectures and directed the BYU Bands, including the Cougar Marching Band. It was there where the previously "unknown" original Russian band music by V. Barsegian and Vladimir Malgin was introduced. In 2007, in recognition of his service and talent, the Ministry of Defense promoted Karabanov to the post of Artistic Director and commanding officer of the Central Navy Band of Russia, which is the highest musical position in the Russian Navy. At the same time, he was also promoted to the senior naval rank of Naval Captain.

References 

1961 births
Living people
Russian composers
Russian male composers
Military personnel from Saint Petersburg
Moscow Conservatory alumni
Moscow Military Music College alumni
Musicians from Saint Petersburg
Russian military musicians
21st-century Russian conductors (music)
Russian male conductors (music)
21st-century Russian male musicians